Robin Álvarez is a Swedish professional ice hockey winger currently playing for Timrå IK in the Swedish Hockey League (SHL).

Playing career
Álvarez started his career with Malmö at the under-18 level in 2004. In 2005 he played for Malmö's under-20 and by the 2007–08 season he was playing for the senior team in the HockeyAllsvenskan.

Career statistics

References

External links

1987 births
Living people
Djurgårdens IF Hockey players
Frölunda HC players 
Malmö Redhawks players
Sportspeople from Malmö
Skellefteå AIK players
Swedish ice hockey forwards
Timrå IK players